Carl-Gustaf Klerck (28 December 1885 – 29 March 1976) was a Swedish fencer. He competed in the individual and team sabre events at the 1912 Summer Olympics.

References

External links

1885 births
1976 deaths
Swedish male sabre fencers
Olympic fencers of Sweden
Fencers at the 1912 Summer Olympics
People from Scania